General elections took place on November 8, 2022, throughout the US state of Indiana.

Federal offices

United States Senate 

Incumbent Todd Young has confirmed that he will run for re-election.

United States House of Representatives

State elections

State Senate

State House of Representatives

Secretary of State 

In 2021, Republican Holli Sullivan was appointed to the 62nd Secretary of State of Indiana by Governor Eric Holcomb.

Treasurer 

Incumbent Republican State Treasurer Kelly Mitchell is ineligible to run for re-election for a third term in office due to term limits.

Auditor 
 

Incumbent Republican State Auditor Tera Klutz is running for re-election. She will be running against Democratic ZeNai Brooks and Libertarian 2018 candidate John Schick.

References

 
Indiana